Sensation Hunters, also known as Club Paradise, is a 1945 American film directed by Christy Cabanne.

Cast 
Robert Lowery as Danny Burke
Doris Merrick as Julie Rogers
Eddie Quillan as Ray Lawson
Constance Worth as Irene
Isabel Jewell as Mae
Wanda McKay as Helen
Nestor Paiva as Lew Davis
Byron Foulger as Mark Rogers
Vince Barnett as Agent
Minerva Urecal as Edna Rogers
Janet Shaw as Katie Rogers
The Rubenettes as Dancing Ensemble
Lyle Talbot as Randall (scenes deleted)
Johnson Brothers as Themselves
Bobby Barber as Waiter
John Hamilton as Night Court Judge 
Dewey Robinson as Stony, Bartender at Paradise Club

References

External links 

 (as Club Paradise)

1945 films
American black-and-white films
1945 drama films
Films directed by Christy Cabanne
American drama films
1940s English-language films
1940s American films